Burnside is a borough in Clearfield County, Pennsylvania, United States. The population was 188 at the 2020 census.

Geography
Burnside is located in southwestern Clearfield County at  (40.813203, -78.787645), along the West Branch Susquehanna River. It is bordered on the north, east, and south by Burnside Township and on the west by Indiana County.

U.S. Route 219 passes through the borough, leading north  to DuBois and south  to Ebensburg.

Demographics

As of the census of 2000, there were 283 people, 102 households, and 79 families residing in the borough. The population density was 168.8 people per square mile (65.0/km2). There were 115 housing units at an average density of 68.6 per square mile (26.4/km2). The racial makeup of the borough was 100.00% White.

There were 102 households, out of which 35.3% had children under the age of 18 living with them, 61.8% were married couples living together, 11.8% had a female householder with no husband present, and 21.6% were non-families. 17.6% of all households were made up of individuals, and 7.8% had someone living alone who was 65 years of age or older. The average household size was 2.77 and the average family size was 3.10.

In the borough the population was spread out, with 25.1% under the age of 18, 8.8% from 18 to 24, 27.9% from 25 to 44, 25.8% from 45 to 64, and 12.4% who were 65 years of age or older. The median age was 37 years. For every 100 females there were 106.6 males. For every 100 females age 18 and over, there were 100.0 males.

The median income for a household in the borough was $21,818, and the median income for a family was $22,031. Males had a median income of $25,833 versus $12,250 for females. The per capita income for the borough was $9,993. About 22.2% of families and 27.2% of the population were below the poverty line, including 48.5% of those under the age of eighteen and 4.4% of those sixty five or over.

References

Populated places established in 1874
Boroughs in Clearfield County, Pennsylvania
1874 establishments in Pennsylvania